Metapedia is an online wiki-based encyclopedia dedicated to fascist, far-right, white nationalist, white supremacist, anti-feminist, homophobic, Islamophobic, antisemitic, Holocaust-denying and neo-Nazi points of view.

History
The Swedish Metapedia was founded in 2006 by Anders Lagerström (born October 14, 1977), a neo-Nazi publisher from Linköping, Sweden. About Lagerström, Östgöta Correspondenten wrote:

Swedish historian Rasmus Fleischer wrote:

Content
Metapedia describes itself as being an alternative to Wikipedia that focuses on culture, art, science, history, politics and philosophy. As of June 2022, the site has more than 7,200 articles in English; topics covered include European history and politics. Crítica de la Argentina says Metapedia has glowing descriptions of Adolf Hitler and other Nazi figures. Daniel Goldhagen describes it as seeking "to create (currently in 18 languages) an anti-Semitic informational universe." Metapedia calls the Holocaust a genocide only according to "politically correct history" and refers to former U.S. President Barack Obama as a "mixed race former president". Its content has been noted for its fascist, far-right, white nationalist, white supremacist, anti-feminist, homophobic, Islamophobic, antisemitic, Holocaust-denying, and neo-Nazi points of view.

The wiki covers a total of 17 languages, with German Metapedia being the most developed.

According to the North Rhine-Westphalian Office for the Protection of the Constitution, Metapedia's articles are characterized by historical negationism and lauding Nazi Germany. For this reason, the German Federal Department for Media Harmful to Young Persons started an indexing process, which would consider as to whether Metapedia is "harmful to young people".

In early 2007, within half a year of the launching of the original Swedish edition, Metapedia received much Swedish media attention for its similarity to Wikipedia and some of its contents, in particular for its positive characterization of many Nazi German personalities, for cataloguing Jews in Swedish media, and for characterizing Swedish companies as either "Swedish-owned" or "Jewish-owned". This led to an investigation by the Chancellor of Justice to decide whether the site should be prosecuted for inciting hatred or for violating the Swedish Privacy Law. After reviewing the site's contents, the Chancellor of Justice decided to terminate investigations, since nothing had been found that violated the Freedom of Speech Act or the Privacy Law. In January 2009, in a response to further attention given to the site, the Swedish Chancellor of Justice opined that Metapedia presented a positive image of Adolf Hitler, but decided not to restart an investigation since this was not illegal.

In a June 2017 article, Alexis Sobel Fitts from Wired noted that the Hungarian and German Metapedia are "especially popular". As of 2022, the Hungarian version is closed.

Operation
Metapedia runs on MediaWiki, a free and open-source wiki software platform written in PHP and built upon the MySQL database.

Metapedia is headed by Lagerström and Lennart Berg, who also runs the supporting NFSE Media AB.

See also

Alt-right
Gab (social network)
Neo-Nazism in Sweden
New Right
Far-right politics
Fascism in Europe

References

External links
 Metapedia in English - Main Page

Alt-right websites
Criticism of feminism
Holocaust-denying websites
MediaWiki websites
Multilingual websites
Neo-Nazi websites
Swedish online encyclopedias
Works about white nationalism
Internet properties established in 2006
White supremacy in Europe
Websites with far-right material
Fascist propaganda
Conspiracist media